Landfall 39 may refer to:

C&C Landfall 39, a Canadian sailboat design
Landfall 39 (Amy), a Taiwanese sailboat design